The Troika card  (Troika) is a contactless reusable card designed to pay for public transport in Moscow. It is the centrepiece of the new ticketing menu introduced in Moscow on April 2, 2013.

Fare options 

Passengers using the Troika card can pay for their trips by bus, trolleybus, or tram for 31 rubles and the Moscow Metro for 32 rubles. In addition, the 90-Minute ticket fare is included on Troika, allowing passengers one ride on the metro or monorail plus an unlimited number of rides on surface transport within one and a half hours.

By June 2015 it is possible to purchase any ticket from the new ticketing menu – Unified, 90 Minute, and TAT – for any number of rides, including unlimited tickets. In addition, users will be able to purchase unlimited rail passes and one-trip tickets on the suburban trains. However, this does not include passes for 10, 20, 60, and 90 trips.

 Transfer between the nearest metro station and the monorail station (VDNKh - Vystavochny Tsentr or Timiryazevskaya (Moscow Metro) - Timiryazevskaya (Monorail)) within 90 minutes with any type of card counts as 1 ride and does not deduct fare of second trip.
 90-minute transfer discount does not apply to trolleybus, bus and tram in Troitsky Administrative Okrug, elektrichka trains or marshrutka (minibus).
 Unlimited cards cannot be used consecutively within 7 minutes.

Buying and topping up Troika card 

Passengers can buy a Troika card at any Metro ticket office and automated Mosgortrans ticket kiosks. They can top it up at Metro ticket windows and automated Metro vending machines.

New functions 

In the near future the Troika card will feature more ways to top up and several new functions. Over the course of 2013 it will be possible to purchase and top up the card at sites outside the Mosgortrans network, such as automated vending machines, mobile phone stores, and payment terminals. By autumn it will be possible to transfer funds to the Troika card via the internet, SMS, electronic payment systems, and smartphone apps. Card owners will be able to register the Troika card to their name, allowing them better control of their balance and the ability to restore funds if they lose their card.

By the end of 2013 Troika card users will be able to top up at payment terminals, online, and via SMS, as well as being able to viewtravel statistics, get a refund in case of card loss, and pay for car parking and suburban train journeys. The Troikacard also helps shorten waiting times at Metro ticket offices and whileboarding surface transport.

Timeline of Troika upgrades

Currently  uses are able to:

 use Troika card to buy tickets for suburban commuter trains, or elektrichka.   
 purchase any fare for Troika card – such as TAT, 90 Minute, and Unified – including Unlimited-ride fares.
 create a personal account on the website http://troika.mos.ru to protect yourself in the event of card theft or loss.  
 top up Troika card at troika.mos.ru, via electronic payment systems, smartphone apps, SMS or USSD requests, payment terminals and ATMs.  
 manage Troika card by dialing ‘3210’ on mobile phone: get account balance, block an account, or replace lost cards. (Passengers must visit the Unified Recovery Center to obtain their repaired cards or replacement cards) 
 use a Troika mobile app to manage an account (for Android and iOS phones). 
 use “Auto pay” to top up Troika account automatically when it falls below a certain amount. For automatic payment, users should personalize their Troika account online and activate “Auto pay.”
 purchase Troika cards in mobile phone stores, such as Svyaznoy, Yevroset’.
 use Troika to pay for car parking, bicycle rental, and other city transport services.

See also
List of smart cards

References

External link

Transport in Moscow
Contactless smart cards
Fare collection systems